Tirano is a town in Valtellina, located in the province of Sondrio in northern Italy. It has 9,053 inhabitants (2016) and is adjacent to the Switzerland-Italy border. The river Adda flows through the town.

Main sights

Located nearby is the Catholic shrine of the Madonna di Tirano, a major tourist attraction. The shrine is dedicated to the appearance of the Blessed Mother to Mario Degli Omodei on September 29, 1504, an event religious pilgrims credit with ending a pestilence.

The Museo Etnografico Tiranese (MET) is an ethnographic museum and located nearby the Basilica Madonna di Tirano in an 18th-century Palazzo, the Casa del Penitenziere (Penitent's House).

The museum of Palazzo Salis in the old town of Tirano is an example of the use of trompe l'oeil to create the illusion of architectural features.

Transportation
Tirano has two neighboring railway stations. One, a standard gauge station, is operated by Trenitalia, the state railway company, and is terminus of the Tirano–Lecco railway.

The other, a metre gauge station, is operated by the Rhaetian Railway (RhB). The line of the Bernina Railway connects St. Moritz (Canton of Graubünden/Switzerland) with  Tirano. The complete line was opened in 1910. In 2008 the Bernina Railway as well as the Albula Railway were added by UNESCO to the list of UNESCO World Heritage Sites.

Notable people
Raffaele Venusti (d.1543) Catholic apologist

See also
 Tirano station (FS)
 Tirano station (RhB)

References

External links

   Official website 
 Museo Palazzo Salis